Kofi Okyere "KOD" Darko (born 13 January 1978) is a Ghanaian broadcaster, Master of Ceremonies, media expert and fashion designer. KOD is the CEO of the clothing line, Nineteen 57, and the founder of the annual fashion and music event, Rhythms on Da Runway.

Early life and education

KOD, formerly Richard Aidoo, was born in 1978 in Winneba, a town in the Central Region of Ghana, to the late Mr. James Aidoo, who is a retired Deputy Director of the Ghanaian Prisons and Mrs. Margaret Aidoo, one of the founding members of the 31 December Women's Movement.

KOD conducted his elementary education in Winneba. He later gained admission to Nifa Secondary School in Adukurom, following which he studied at Ghana Institute of Journalism.

Career

KOD first worked as a production assistant for a TV show on Ghana Broadcasting Corporation for a short period of time. He later left to join the then budding and vibrant Radio Gold. Following this, he left the shores of Ghana for England to seek greener pastures and to explore other opportunities. He wanted to be a model at first, but all he could find was work as a security guard. During this time, he was posted to fashion houses like Ted Baker, Paul Smith, etc. On one such duty post, the manager at Paul Smith spotted the sharpness of his outfit and urged him to quit his job as a security guard and apply there as a salesperson. When KOD saw what a great chance he had, he quickly applied for the job and was given it. After two years of living in England, he came back to Ghana to continue working with Radio Gold. He joined the EIB Network, LIVE FM as a presenter and events and marketing manager in August 2015. He is currently the host of "Starr Drive" on Starr FM in Accra, Ghana.

Personal life

KOD is married to fashion designer Ophelia Crossland; together they have two daughters.

Honors and awards
 He won the 2015 Most Stylish Radio Personality of the Year at Glitz Style Awards
 Kofi was nominated at 2016 Male Fashion Celebrity Icon of the Year at the 2016 Ghana Fashion Awards
 Kofi won 2017 Man of The Year Style Award (Most Fashionable Man of The Year) at the Exclusive Men Of The Year Awards.

See also
List of fashion designers

References

Living people
1978 births
Ghanaian broadcasters
Ghanaian fashion designers
Ghanaian journalists